The Barnet Boys School Boer War Memorial is located opposite Christ Church on the St Albans Road in Chipping Barnet, London. It marks the deaths of the eight former pupils of Barnet Boys School who died in the Second Boer War of 1899 to 1902 and was unveiled by Field Marshal Lord Grenfell in July 1903. It has been grade II listed on the National Heritage List for England since June 2017. The heritage listing describes the monument as "simple yet dignified".

Description
The memorial is in the form of a marble obelisk on a square marble pedestal base on a marble platform on a paving slab. It is decorated by a relief sculpture of a crossed rifle and sword on its front and back imposed over a laurel wreath. On the front face of the pedestal is inscribed.

References

External links

1903 establishments in England
Grade II listed buildings in the London Borough of Barnet
Grade II listed monuments and memorials
Military memorials in London
Obelisks in England
Second Boer War memorials
Chipping Barnet